Maren Nævdal Mjelde (born 6 November 1989) is a Norwegian professional footballer who plays as a defender or midfielder for Chelsea and captains the Norway national team. She previously played for Kopparbergs/Göteborg FC of the Swedish Damallsvenskan, Turbine Potsdam of the Frauen-Bundesliga and both Arna-Bjørnar and Avaldsnes IL of the Norwegen Toppserien.

Club career
Mjelde was born in Bergen. She joined the Norwegian club, Arna-Bjørnar, as a 15-year-old in 2005. The club finished the 2012 Toppserien league in third place, earning the bronze medal that year. She transferred to the German club Turbine Potsdam before the 2013 season. She played all the club's matches in the latter part of the season, when they reached the runner-up position in the German Cup and League competitions.

On 22 November 2016, Mjelde signed for Chelsea Ladies on a deal until 2018.

On 16 November 2019, Mjelde scored the only goal in Chelsea Women's historic win versus Manchester United Women, the first game ever played between these two female teams in the WSL 1.

International career
In October 2007, Mjelde made her senior international debut for Norway against Russia. She was selected for UEFA Women's Euro 2009, and the 2011 FIFA Women's World Cup. Mjelde scored her first goal for Norway against Ukraine in a qualifying play–off for the latter competition.

Mjelde was Norway's vice captain during 2011 and 2012 through the team's qualification campaign for the UEFA Women's Euro 2013 and captained the side in many matches. In the tournament she played at right-back for the first time ever, and captained the team in their match in group B when Norway beat Germany 1–0 on 17 July.  Norway lost the final 0–1 to Germany, and Mjelde was included in UEFA's Squad of the Tournament.

Mjelde was selected in Even Pellerud's squad for the 2015 FIFA Women's World Cup. She scored against Germany in a 1–1 draw in the group stage and played in Norway's second round defeat by England.

Personal life 
Mjelde's elder brother, Erik Mjelde, is a former footballer.

Career statistics
Scores and results list Norway's goal tally first, score column indicates score after each Mjelde goal.

Honours
Chelsea
FA WSL: 2017–18, 2019–20, 2020–21, 2021–22
FA Women's Cup: 2017–18
FA Women's League Cup: 2019–20, 2020–21
FA Community Shield: 2020

References

External links

 
 NFF profile 
 Turbine Potsdam profile 
 
 

1989 births
Living people
Norwegian women's footballers
Norway women's international footballers
Arna-Bjørnar players
BK Häcken FF players
Damallsvenskan players
1. FFC Turbine Potsdam players
Norwegian expatriate women's footballers
Expatriate women's footballers in Germany
Expatriate women's footballers in England
Norwegian expatriate sportspeople in Germany
Norwegian expatriate sportspeople in Sweden
Norwegian expatriate sportspeople in England
Footballers from Bergen
Women's association football midfielders
Women's association football defenders
2015 FIFA Women's World Cup players
Avaldsnes IL players
Chelsea F.C. Women players
Toppserien players
Women's Super League players
Expatriate women's footballers in Sweden
FIFA Century Club
2019 FIFA Women's World Cup players
2011 FIFA Women's World Cup players
UEFA Women's Euro 2022 players
UEFA Women's Euro 2017 players